Kinetic Melbourne is a bus operator in Melbourne, Australia, operating a fleet of 531 buses on 43 bus routes, as well as seven SmartBus routes. It commenced operations on 31 January 2022, taking over all routes previously operated by Transdev Melbourne. It is a subsidiary of the Kinetic Group.

History

In October 2021, the Victorian Department of Transport awarded Kinetic Melbourne a contract to operate the Melbourne Bus Franchise until June 2031. It commenced operations on 31 January 2022.

Services
Kinetic Melbourne took over the operation of 50 routes spanning Melbourne's metropolitan area, which include 3 SmartBus Orbital routes and the Doncaster Area Rapid Transit (DART) routes.

Fleet

Kinetic Melbourne commenced operations with 531 buses transferred from Transdev Melbourne. 

As part of the contract, 36 zero-emissions buses will be introduced to the fleet by mid-2025 and 341 of the 531 buses will be replaced with low to zero-emissions buses.

As at February 2023, the fleet consists of 567 buses. Most buses are painted in the Public Transport Victoria livery, except for SmartBus liveried buses that have retained this livery for use on SmartBus routes.

References

Bus companies of Victoria (Australia)
Bus transport in Melbourne
Kinetic Group companies
Transport companies established in 2022
2022 establishments in Australia
Australian companies established in 2022
Companies based in Melbourne